Road America is a motorsport road course located near Elkhart Lake, Wisconsin, United States on Wisconsin Highway 67. It has hosted races since the 1950s and currently hosts races in the NASCAR Xfinity Series, WeatherTech SportsCar Championship, IndyCar Series, SCCA Pirelli World Challenge, ASRA, AMA Superbike series, and SCCA Pro Racing's Trans-Am Series. NASCAR replaced the Cup Series race at Road America with street racing through Downtown Chicago starting in 2023.

Current track and facilities
Road America is a permanent road course. It is located midway between the cities of Milwaukee and Green Bay, and classified as an FIA Grade Two circuit.

The track is situated on  near the Kettle Moraine Scenic Drive. It has hosted races since September 1955 and currently hosts over 400 events a year. Of its annual events, 9 major weekends are open to the public which include 3 motorcycle events including the MotoAmerica (AMA FIM) series, 3 vintage car events, Sports Car Club of America (SCCA) events, the United Sports Car Racing Series, the Pirelli World Challenge, and the NASCAR Xfinity Series.

Road America is one of only a handful of road circuits in the world maintaining its original configuration being  in length with 14 turns. The track features many elevation changes, along with a long front stretch where speeds approaching 200 mph (320 km/h) may be reached. One of the best known features of this course is a turn on the backside known as "the kink".

Road America's open seating allows spectators to venture throughout the grounds. Grandstands are available in several locations, as well as permanent hillside seating where crowds of more than 150,000 can be accommodated.

Briggs & Stratton Motorplex
In addition to the main course, the facility includes a  karting track called the Briggs & Stratton Motorplex inside the Carousel. The motorplex hosts two series of karting events. It hosts weekly events on Tuesdays in the summer. It also hosts approximately six Saturday events during the summer. The motorplex also hosts events sanctioned by the North Woods GP series running Supermoto and street bike racing using small displacement motorcycles.

Off road racing circuit
The Motorplex was built at the site of an earlier off road racing circuit used for several SODA events in the 1990s. The 1995 event was televised tape delayed on ESPN2 by reporters Marty Reid, Ivan Stewart, and Jimmie Johnson. The track featured a blind jump nicknamed "The Hell Hole".

Tunnel
In late 2006, Road America began a project to remove the old Bill Mitchell bridge and use a tunnel as the main entrance to the paddock. The tunnel project was completed in May 2007 with the grand opening celebration on May 31 for the AMA Suzuki Superbike Championship weekend. With the removal of the bridge, a new spectator viewing area was created.

History of racing at Elkhart Lake

Open road course

In the late 1940s, road racing was gaining popularity, owing to the post World War II economy, and the influx of sporting automobiles. The Sports Car Club of America was the main organizer of these races, and in 1950, the Chicago Region SCCA and the Village of Elkhart Lake organized the first road race at Elkhart Lake.

For the next two races, in 1951 and 1952, a different course was used.

The original course was registered on the National Register of Historic Places on February 17, 2006. Signs have been installed marking key locations on the course.

Private road course
After the tragedy at Watkins Glen in 1952, where a child was killed, the U.S. ruled to discontinue motorized contests of speed on public highways. This was a major blow for competition auto racing and brought the end of a long-standing tradition. This did not permanently stop road racing, however, it did shift it to private courses. In 1955, Clif Tufte started what is now known as Road America, in a configuration that has changed little over the past 60 years. The addition of Road America as a private track meant a transition from racing through the streets of tiny Elkhart Lake to racing on a big, wide, dedicated race track.

Racing at Road America
Many different racing series have had the occasion to race at Road America. The first was the Sports Car Club of America (SCCA) on September 10, 1955. The Road America 500 is a sports car race that was part of different championships, among them the SCCA National Sports Car Championship, the United States Road Racing Championship and the IMSA GT Championship. Currently it is a points-paying race of the IMSA SportsCar Championship. The Grand Prix of Road America is an open-wheel race that was held as part of the Champ Car World Series and currently it is a part of the IndyCar Series.

Other notable series have included NASCAR's Grand National (now NASCAR Cup Series) in 1956 and NASCAR Xfinity Series since 2010, CART from 1982 until 2007, Grand-Am Rolex Sports Car Racing Series, CanAm, Trans-Am, AMA, and the SCCA National Championship Runoffs from 2009 to 2013. The Stadium Super Trucks began racing at the track starting in 2018; the trucks run a shortened course that bypasses turns 6 to 12, though the full layout is used on the final lap.

Road America also holds a variety of vintage racing events, including the Brian Redman International Challenge, now the HAWK with Brian Redman.

ALMS race history
At the 2008 Road America 500 an Audi R10 TDI set an LMP1 pole time of 1:46.935. At the 2009 Road Race Showcase, Dyson Racing Team set an LMP2 pole time of 1:51.010. At the 2011 Road Race Showcase, BMW Team RLL set a GT pole time of 2:05.447, while at the same event a Porsche 997 GT3 set a GTC pole time of 2:14.126.

NASCAR race history

Cup Series

One NASCAR Grand National (now NASCAR Cup Series) race was held in 1956. The track hosted two more Cup series races in 2021 and 2022 before being planned to be replaced by the Chicago Street Race in 2023.

Xfinity Series

On December 21, 2009, NASCAR announced that with the situation at the Wisconsin State Fair Park being unclear, and losing races at the Milwaukee Mile, they would move Milwaukee's Xfinity Series race to Road America. The first race was held on June 19, 2010 and was won by Carl Edwards. In 2015, the race moved to late August during an off-weekend for the Sprint Cup Series.

2011: Race extended due to three green–white–checker finish attempts and ended under caution when the three attempts to finish the race failed.
2013: Race extended due to two green-white-checker finish attempts.
2014, 2016, 2022: Race extended due to green-white-checker finish attempt.

Indy Car / Champ Car race results

The CART Champ Car series held races at the track from 1982 to 2007, with the exception of 2005. The Verizon Indy Car Series revived the event beginning in 2016.

Major incidents and events at the track

2005 BRIC wreck
At the beginning of the Group 6 race in the 2005 Brian Redman International Challenge, there was a large incident consisting of most of the field: The driver starting fifth (Ray Mulacek, 1969 Chevrolet Camaro) accelerated well before the green flag and tried to force his way between the wall and the car in front of him, resulting in contact with the wall. A following car checked up and was rear-ended, causing a spin that led to further contact as following cars were unable to avoid the growing incident. After just a few seconds of green flag racing, the red flag was waved. Following the initial incident, the failure of trailing drivers to heed red flags being shown at 14 and 15 (under the bridge at the crest of the hill) may have compounded the issue. Luckily, nobody was seriously injured, with the worst injury being a broken arm.

Cristiano da Matta deer incident
On August 3, 2006, Cristiano da Matta, driver of Champ Car's RuSPORT team and 2002 series champion, was involved in a collision with a deer during Champ Car open testing at Road America. The deer ran in front of his car as he was heading towards turn 6. He hit the deer with his right front tire, the deer then flew back and hit da Matta in the cockpit. Da Matta was unconscious when the safety crew extricated him from the car, and was airlifted via ThedaSTAR to Theda Clark Medical Center south of Appleton, where he underwent surgery to remove a subdural hematoma.

Death of Adam Schatz
Adam Schatz, 26, from Chicago, Illinois, died in a karting accident during the Road America Super Nationals, Championship Enduro Series on July 12, 2008.

Bump drafting was a determining factor of the crash.

During the end of the race, Schatz was in second place. On the main straight, shortly after the last turn, Schatz saw the kart in third position on his left and tried to pull ahead to be bumped. As he did so, the kart in fourth position bumped the third, speeding the third kart up. At this point Schatz was not clear as to what was happening, and as he moved to his left, the two karts made contact.

Schatz's kart veered hard left and hit the wall. The impact sent the kart flying ten feet into the air ejecting the driver onto the track. The rest of the drivers avoided Schatz, some drivers stopped and after seeing Schatz's condition, waved to get medical help.

The race was immediately stopped as medical assistance arrived on the place of the accident. Schatz had suffered brain stem and spinal cord injuries and his heart had stopped. He was revived by the doctors and taken to the Theda Clark Memorial Hospital in Neenah, Wisconsin, but his injuries proved to be too severe to survive and one week later he died.

2015 CCR Tifosi Challenge red flag wreck
During the Pirelli World Challenge weekend, drivers Steve Hill and Jim Booth were involved in an intense battle for first. The drivers contacted each other heading towards turn 5, causing Jim Booth to go airborne into the catch fence at 150 mph. This caused significant damage to the fence throwing debris into the spectator area. Booth's car was completely destroyed while Hill was able to continue the race with minor damage. Neither of the drivers, personnel, or spectators were injured during the incident.

Lap records

The official lap record for Road America is 1:41.874, set by Alex Zanardi in the 1998 Texaco/Havoline 200, while the unofficial all-time track record is 1:39.866, set by Dario Franchitti during the qualifying of the 2000 Motorola 220. As of August 2022, the fastest official race lap records at Road America for different classes are listed as:

Other events
Road America is host to several non-automotive events. 
 The Tour de Road America - Bike Ride to Fight Cancer is a bike ride on the track to raise funds for the Livestrong Foundation, the Austin Hatcher Foundation, and the Vince Lombardi Cancer Clinic. The annual event has taken place every August since 2004 during the Champ Car and/or American Le Mans Series weekends, and has raised over $230,000 as of 2012. It raised over $37,000 in 2012. The 10th Tour de Road America is scheduled for August 9, 2013 during the American Le Mans / Grand Am weekend (August 9–11, 2013).
 The Road America Inline Challenge is an inline skating race on the track in June. A fun lap is also part of the event, which has taken place since 2006.
 The Annual Road America Walk/Run for the American Cancer Society has raised $2.5 million plus in its 33-year existence. The Walk/Run takes place in late October. The 2007 and 2008 events included a Mid-American Stock Car Series exhibition.

In pop culture

Video games
The Road America track has been included in multiple racing video games, including Automobilista 2, the Forza Motorsport series, CART Precision Racing, iRacing, Raceroom Racing Experience, NASCAR Heat 2, NASCAR Heat 3, NASCAR Heat 4,NASCAR Heat 5, Need for Speed: Shift, Shift 2: Unleashed, Project CARS, Project CARS 2, TOCA Race Driver 2, and Ride 3.

Photo gallery

Notes

References

External links
 Road America Official Site
 Map and circuit history at RacingCircuits.info
 
 Karting Club at the Road America Motorplex

Champ Car circuits
IndyCar Series tracks
Motorsport venues in Wisconsin
NASCAR tracks
ARCA Menards Series tracks
Buildings and structures in Sheboygan County, Wisconsin
National Register of Historic Places in Sheboygan County, Wisconsin
American Le Mans Series circuits
IMSA GT Championship circuits
Tourist attractions in Sheboygan County, Wisconsin
NASCAR races at Road America
Off-road racing venues in the United States
Sports venues on the National Register of Historic Places in Wisconsin
Sports venues completed in 1955
1955 establishments in Wisconsin
Road courses in the United States